Bench Global Ltd. (usually branded as "Bench.") is a British clothing brand that is sold worldwide, including in Europe and Canada. The company was founded in Manchester, England, and specialises in streetwear.

History 
The brand began in 1989 creating graphic T-shirt designs influenced by skateboarding. The Manchester based fashion firm was founded by Nayef Marar and Barrie Suddons, and was acquired in 2004 by a management team led by finance director Alan Horridge for the company Americana for £20m. Over the years, Bench has evolved into a global lifestyle brand that now sells not only menswear but womenswear, including denim, trousers, sweats, hoodies, belts, bags, skirts and dresses.

The company appointed administrators in May 2018.

Gordon Brothers have secured the brand for continued development.

Apparel Brands Limited have secured the European license to relaunch the European Bench.

In January 2020, the company announced that all 24 of its stores in Canada would be closed and that it would "focus more on our e-commerce business as well as our key wholesale customers".

References

External links 

Clothing companies of the United Kingdom
Companies that have entered administration in the United Kingdom
Privately held companies of the United Kingdom
1989 establishments in the United Kingdom